Puerto Rico competed at the 1992 Summer Olympics in Barcelona, Spain.

Medalists

Competitors
The following is the list of number of competitors in the Games.

Results by event

Athletics
Men's 200 metres
Edgardo Guilbe

Men's Marathon
Jorge González

Men's 400m Hurdles
Domingo Cordero
 Heat — 50.19 (→ did not advance, no ranking)

Men's Long Jump
Michael Francis
 Qualification — 7.47 m (→ did not advance)

Elmer Williams
 Qualification — 7.70 m (→ did not advance)

Men's Pole Vault
Edgar Díaz
 Qualification — 5.50 m (→ did not advance)

Women's 100 metres
Myra Mayberry-Wilkinson

Women's 400 metres
Myra Mayberry-Wilkinson

Baseball

Men's team competition
The Puerto Ricans won only two of the seven games of the preliminary round in the debut of Olympic baseball. Their victories came against Italy and the Dominican Republic, while the five losses included one against last-place Spain after the Dominicans lost their 6-4 lead in the bottom of the ninth. Their record in the preliminary round eliminated them from medal contention.

Preliminary round
Lost to Japan (0:9)
Defeated Dominican Republic (7:5)
Lost to Chinese Taipei (1:10)
Defeated Italy (2:0)
Lost to United States (2:8)
Lost to Cuba (4:9)
Lost to Spain(6:7) → 5th place
Team roster:
 Jorge Aranzamendi Torres
 Roberto Lopez Ocasio
 Angel Morales Rodriguez
 Efrain Garcia Santiago
 Helson Rodriguez Santiago
 Albert Bracero Chevere
 Manuel Serrano
 José Lorenzana Oquendo
 Luis Ramos Torres
 Silvio Censale
 Abimael Rosario Marrero
 Efrain Nieves Soto
 Gualberto Lopez Ortiz
 Wilfredo Velez Leon
 James Figueroa
 Rafael Santiago Rivera
 Jesus Feliciano Amadeo
 José Mateo Rosario
 Orlando Lopez Bobian
 José Sepulveda Pinto
Head coach: José Carradero Muriel

Basketball

Men's team competition
Preliminary round (group B):
 Lost to Australia (76-116)
 Defeated China (100-68)
 Lost to Lithuania (91-104)
 Defeated Venezuela (96-82)
 Defeated Unified Team (82-70)
Quarter Finals:
 Lost to United States (77-115)
Classification Matches:
 5th/8th place: Lost to Brazil (84-86)
 7th/8th place: Lost to Germany (86-96) → 8th place
Team roster:
 ( 4.) José Ortiz
 ( 5.) Federico Lopez
 ( 6.) Raymond Gause
 ( 7.) Edwin Pellot
 ( 8.) Jerome Mincy
 ( 9.) James Carter
 (10.) Javier Antonio Colón
 (11.) Ramon Rivas
 (12.) Mario Morales
 (13.) Edgar De Leon
 (14.) Eddie Casiano
 (15.) Richard Soto

Boxing
Men's Light Flyweight (– 48 kg)
 Nelson Dieppa
 First Round — Lost to Daniel Petrov (BUL), 7:10

Men's Flyweight (– 51 kg)
 Angel Chacón
 First Round — Lost to David Serradas (VEN), 3:12

Men's Bantamweight (– 54 kg)
 Harold Ramírez
 First Round — Lost to Sergio Reyes Jr. (USA), 1:10

Men's Featherweight (– 57 kg)
 Carlos Gerena
 First Round — Defeated Narendar Singh Bisth (USA), 20:11
 Second Round — Lost to Hocine Soltani (ALG), 0:23

Men's Welterweight (– 67 kg)
 Aníbal Acevedo
 First Round — Defeated Harry Simon (NAM), 13:11
 Second Round — Defeated Stefen Scriggins (AUS), 16:3
 Quarterfinals — Defeated Francisc Vaştag (ROM), 20:9
 Semifinals — Lost to Juan Hernández Sierra (CUB), 2:11 →  Bronze Medal

Men's Light-Middleweight (– 71 kg)
 Miguel Jiménez
 First Round — Lost to Furas Hashim (IRQ), 3:10

Men's Middleweight (– 75 kg)
 Richard Santiago
 First Round — Lost to Sven Ottke (GER), 2:15

Men's Light-Heavyweight (– 81 kg)
 Alex González
 First Round — Lost to Wojciech Bartnik (POL), 3:6

Gymnastics
Men's Floor Exercise
Victor Colon

Men's Horse Vault
Victor Colon

Men's Parallel Bars
Victor Colon

Men's Horizontal Bar
Victor Colon

Men's Rings
Victor Colon

Men's Pommelled Horse
Victor Colon

Judo
Men's Extra-Lightweight
Luis Martínez

Women's Half-Lightweight
Lisa Boscarino

Women's Lightweight
Maniliz Segarra

Women's Heavyweight
Nilmaris Santini

Sailing
Men's One Person Dinghy
José Sambolin

Mixed Multihull
Enrique Figueroa and Oscar Mercado

Women's Sailboard (Lechner A-390)
Lucia Martínez
 Final Ranking — 205.0 points (→ 19th place)

Shooting
Men's Small-Bore Rifle Prone (50 m)
Ralph Rodríguez

Mixed Trap
Jesús Tirado

Swimming
Men's 50 m Freestyle
Ricardo Busquets
 Heat — 23.44 (→ did not advance, 24th place)

Todd Torres
 Heat — 23.79 (→ did not advance, 34th place)

Men's 100 m Freestyle
Ricardo Busquets
 Heat — 50.31
 B-Final — 49.92 (→ 9th place)

Men's 400 m Freestyle
Jorge Herrera
 Heat — 4:00.11 (→ did not advance, 30th place)

Men's 1500 m Freestyle
Jorge Herrera
 Heat — 16:01.69 (→ did not advance, 24th place)

Men's 100 m Backstroke
Manuel Guzmán
 Heat — 56.93 (→ did not advance, 17th place)

Ricardo Busquets
 Heat — 58.42 (→ did not advance, 38th place)

Men's 200 m Backstroke
Manuel Guzmán
 Heat — 2:01.84
 B-Final — 2:01.87 (→ 13th place)

Men's 100 m Breaststroke
Todd Torres
 Heat — 1:02.72
 B-Final — 1:03.21 (→ 16th place)

Men's 200 m Butterfly
David Monasterio
 Heat — 2:02.32 (→ did not advance, 30th place)

Men's 200 m Individual Medley
Manuel Guzmán
 Heat — 2:04.95
 B-Final — Withdrawn

Men's 400 m Individual Medley
David Monasterio
 Heat — 4:36.39 (→ did not advance, 28th place)

Men's 4 × 100 m Freestyle Relay
 Manuel Guzmán, Jorge Herrera, David Monasterio, and Ricardo Busquets
 Heat — 3:30.48 (→ did not advance, 13th place)

Men's 4 × 200 m Freestyle Relay
 Jorge Herrera, Manuel Guzmán, Ricardo Busquets, and David Monasterio
 Heat — 7:35.63 (→ did not advance, 15th place)

Men's 4 × 100 m Medley Relay
 Manuel Guzmán, Todd Torres, David Monasterio, and Ricardo Busquets
 Heat — 3:46.52 (→ did not advance, 12th place)

Women's 200 m Freestyle
Rita Garay
 Heat — 2:07.08 (→ did not advance, 27th place)

Women's 100 m Backstroke
Rita Garay
 Heat — 1:05.92 (→ did not advance, 34th place)

Women's 200 m Backstroke
Rita Garay
 Heat — 2:18.10 (→ did not advance, 27th place)

Tennis
Men's Singles Competition
Juan Rios
 First round — Lost to Omar Camporese (Italy) 2-6, 2-6, 0-6

Men's Doubles Competition
Juan Rios and Miguel Nido
 First round — Lost to Omar Camporese and Diego Nargiso (Italy) 1-6, 2-6, 3-6

Weightlifting
Men's Light-Heavyweight
Arnold Franqui

Wrestling
Men's Freestyle Featherweight
Anibál Nieves

Men's Freestyle Middleweight
José Betancourt

Men's Freestyle Light-Heavyweight
Daniel Sánchez

Men's Freestyle Super-Heavyweight
Rodney Figueroa

See also

Puerto Rico at the 1991 Pan American Games

References

sports-reference

Nations at the 1992 Summer Olympics
1992
Olympics